Jaka Blažič (born June 30, 1990) is a Slovenian professional basketball player for Bahçeşehir Koleji of the Basketbol Süper Ligi (BSL) and Basketball Champions League. He also represents the Slovenian national basketball team.

Early life
Born in the town of Jesenice in a family of athletes—skiing coach father Dušan Blažič and mother Ksenija who had formerly played volleyball—young Jaka took up basketball early. His younger sister Pia is a professional volleyball player.

Professional career

Blažič started his professional career in 2007 with Triglav Kranj. From 2009 to 2011 he played with Geoplin Slovan.

In July 2011, he signed a three-year deal with Union Olimpija.

On June 18, 2013, Blažič signed a three-year deal with the Serbian team Crvena zvezda. On September 14, 2015, he parted ways with the club.

One day later, on September 15, 2015, he signed a three-year contract with the Spanish team Baskonia. On July 3, 2017, Blažič parted ways with Baskonia.

On July 16, 2017, Blazič signed with MoraBanc Andorra for the 2017–18 season. On August 9, 2018, Blazič signed a one-year deal with FC Barcelona Lassa of the Liga ACB and the EuroLeague.

On July 20, 2019, Blazič signed a two-year contract with Cedevita Olimpija.

On June 2, 2022, he has signed with Bahçeşehir Koleji of the Turkish Basketball Super League (BSL).

National team career
As a member of the senior men's Slovenian national basketball team, Blažič competed at the EuroBasket 2013 and 2014 FIBA World Cup. He also represented Slovenia at the EuroBasket 2015 where they were eliminated by Latvia in eighth finals. 

He was part of the national team at the 2017 EuroBasket and 2020 Summer Olympics where Slovenia took gold and fourth place, respectively.

Career statistics

EuroLeague

|-
| style="text-align:left;"| 2011–12
| style="text-align:left;" rowspan=2| Union Olimpija
| 10|| 1 || 14.2 || .350 || .182 || .600 || 2.4 || .4 || .2 || .0 || 3.6 || 2.3
|-
| style="text-align:left;"| 2012–13
| 10 || 9 || 28.3 || .373 || .278 || .731 || 4.0 || 1.9 || .5 || .0 || 12.4 || 10.9
|-
| style="text-align:left;"| 2013–14
| style="text-align:left;" rowspan=2| Crvena zvezda
| 10 || 2 || 19.7 || .462 || .345 || .750 || 3.5 || 1.1 || .9 || .2 || 10.3 || 8.8
|-
| style="text-align:left;"| 2014–15
| 24 || 10 || 21.4 || .422 || .309 || .750 || 2.8 || 1.0 || .5 || .1 || 9.1 || 5.8
|-
| style="text-align:left;"| 2015–16
| style="text-align:left;" rowspan=2| Baskonia
| 29 || 3 || 19.0 || .432 || .352 || .793 || 3.2 || .6 || .6 || 0 || 7.8 || 6.4
|-
| style="text-align:left;"| 2016–17
| 33 || 7 || 13.9 || .397 || .387 || .560 || 2.1 || .5 || .5 || 0 || 4.7 || 3.3
|-
| style="text-align:left;"| 2018–19
| style="text-align:left;"| Barcelona
| 25 || 7 || 13.7 || .465 || .387 || .809 || 2.3 || .6 || .4 || .1 || 5.2 || 5.7
|- class="sortbottom"
| style="text-align:left;"| Career
| style="text-align:left;"|
| 141 || 39 || 17.6 || .418 || .338 || .743 || 2.7 || .7 || .5 || .1 || 7.0 || 5.7

Personal life

2014 traffic accident
In the early morning hours of Saturday, 4 October 2014, Blažič caused a traffic accident while driving under the influence, slamming his Volkswagen Golf into the back of a taxi vehicle while changing lanes at the corner of Nemanjina and Resavska streets in central Belgrade. No injuries were reported as the traffic patrol administered a breathalyzer test on the twenty-four-year-old KK Crvena zvezda basketball player, determining his blood alcohol level was above the 0.5‰ legal limit in Serbia. Several hours earlier, Friday evening 3 October 2014, Blažič had played in KK Crvena zvezda's opening game of the 2014–15 Adriatic League season versus Levski Sofia, an 85-55 blowout win in which he contributed 8 points including a spectacular dunk. 

Later in the day, after paying the RSD16,000 (~€135) fine to the misdemeanor judge, Blažič publicly apologized "to the taxi driver whose car I hit, as well as to my club and its fans" while his club Crvena zvezda fined him according to its own disciplinary code of conduct by reportedly docking the amount of two monthly salaries from his pay.

See also 
 List of KK Crvena zvezda players with 100 games played

References

External links

Jaka Blažič at acb.com 
Jaka Blažič at draftexpress.com
Jaka Blažič at eurobasket.com
Jaka Blažič at euroleague.net

1990 births
Living people
2014 FIBA Basketball World Cup players
ABA League players
Bahçeşehir Koleji S.K. players
Basketball players at the 2020 Summer Olympics
FC Barcelona Bàsquet players
FIBA EuroBasket-winning players
KK Cedevita Olimpija players
KK Crvena zvezda players
KK Olimpija players
Liga ACB players
Olympic basketball players of Slovenia
Saski Baskonia players
Shooting guards
Slovenian expatriate basketball people in Serbia
Slovenian expatriate basketball people in Spain
Slovenian men's basketball players
Small forwards
Sportspeople from Jesenice, Jesenice